The Wood River Branch Railroad was a shortline railroad in Rhode Island, United States. Chartered in 1872 and opened on July 1, 1874, the  line connected Hope Valley, Rhode Island to the national rail network at Wood River Junction. Though always nominally independent, the company was closely affiliated with the New York, Providence and Boston Railroad and its successor, the New York, New Haven and Hartford Railroad (the New Haven), which held significant portions of its stock.

The Wood River Branch carried both passengers and freight for local mills and other industries. It maintained a small fleet of locomotives, only one or two at any given time. Rhode Island citizen Ralph C. Watrous purchased the railroad in 1897, and remained involved in its operation for the next 40 years. He defended the railroad from several attempts at abandonment. A major flood in November 1927 severed the line and suspended all operations. The company considered abandonment, but ultimately local citizens and the New Haven agreed to rebuild the damaged segments and return the line to service for freight only, using a gasoline locomotive.

Abandonment was considered again in 1937, but the New Haven instead agreed to sell the line for $301 to businessman Roy Rawlings, owner of a grain mill that was the line's biggest customer. He ran the company with one employee until 1947. That year, both his mill and another Hope Valley industry were destroyed by fire. With not enough business left to justify operating expenses, the railroad ceased operations and was abandoned in its entirety in August 1947. Little of the line remains today.

History

Formation and construction 
Southern Rhode Island's first railroad was the New York, Providence and Boston Railroad (commonly known as the Stonington Line), which opened between Providence and Stonington, Connecticut, in 1837, connecting to New York City via steamboat. The arrival of rail transportation allowed significant growth in textile mills, which utilized water power along local rivers, such as the Pawcatuck River. These mills found that transportation over land was a significant expense in both time and money. In the mid-1860s. Harris Lamphear, owner of several mills on the Wood River (a tributary of the Pawcatuck), found that it cost three times as much to transport goods to Stonington than it did to ship them the rest of the way to New York. He and other local residents realized that a local railroad would solve this problem. 

Residents in the Hope Valley area first asked the Stonington to build a branch to serve local mills, but they were among many towns and cities along the Stonington's route that also desired branches, and the Stonington's management had no interest in building any branches regardless. Their next method was to charter their own new railroad, the Wood River Railroad, in January 1867. The new company was authorized to raise up to $600,000 to complete a route from Wood River Junction (at the time known as Richmond Switch) on the Stonington Line to Greene on the Hartford, Providence and Fishkill Railroad (HP&F); it was also given the authority to merge with either of its connections after completing construction. Their goal was to entice one of the proposed line's connections to intervene and build the line for them, a tactic successfully employed elsewhere across the United States. Ultimately, the Stonington maintained its refusal to build branches, and while the HP&F built several short branches elsewhere, it had no interest in building one in southern Rhode Island. Without the resources of a larger railroad, no progress was made and the charter expired five years later. 

Once the first charter expired, interested residents in the area sought out a new charter, this time intending to build the railroad themselves. The Wood River Branch Railroad was chartered in May 1872, along an approximately  route beginning at Richmond Switch and ending in Hope Valley, although the exact terminus location was not specified. The Hope Valley villages of Locustville and Wyoming both sought to have the railroad's terminus. To choose a route, the railroad's directors arranged for all stock subscriptions to be sorted into three groups: those who wanted a Wyoming terminus, those who wanted a Locustville terminus, and those who had no preference. By May 20, 172 shares had been pledged, including 50 for Locustville and 20 for Wyoming, with the remainder expressing no preference. The directors voted that the company's terminal would be Locustville if $35,000 were raised, but Wyoming instead if either $45,000 were raised or those in favor of Wyoming pledged a total of $10,000. 

A survey was started under the direction of George T. Lanphear on July 17, 1872, and completed on August 2. Lanphear identified two routes from Richmond Switch to Locustville. The western of the two alignments he identified was $10,000 more expensive, but would serve two additional mills in Woodville. To extend the line from Locustville to Wyoming would cost approximately an additional $23,000.

While progress had been made on raising funds, the railroad was negatively impacted by both the Panic of 1873 and a deadly train collision on the Stonington Line at Richmond Switch. Most subscribers to the Wood River Branch's stock reduced their subscriptions accordingly, and one mill owner's pledge of 101 shares was wiped out with his death. The company was saved when on June 23, 1873, the Stonington Line finally decided to get involved and directly pledged $19,000, plus two $1,000 pledges made directly by that company's executives. At this point, the Wood River Branch had $59,500 of subscribed stock, which was barely sufficient to reach Locustville, let alone Wyoming. The latter was excluded from the final route, much to the anger of Wyoming residents. 

Construction of the line began on September 20, 1873, with a $95,500 contract awarded to J.B. Dacey & Co. to build the entire line. After delays caused by winter weather, construction was completed between Wood River Junction and Woodville by April 1874. The line opened for business on July 1, 1874.

Operations 

Train operations were initially run with a single locomotive (The Gardner Nichols, a 4-4-0 steam locomotive) and three cars for passengers and mail. The Stonington Line was purchased by the New York, New Haven and Hartford Railroad in 1892, which continued its hands-off approach.

The company was purchased in 1897 by Rhode Island resident Ralph C. Watrous (though the New Haven retained significant interest in the company), "so his mother wouldn't feel lonely or isolated in her Hope Valley home". Watrous would serve as the Wood River Branch's president for the next 40 years, and steadfastly defeated several attempts at abandonment. He recalled one instance when he gave a New Haven Railroad executive intent on abandoning the line "some doughnuts, a glass of milk, and let him talk to my mother ... we decided not to abandon it".

The Wood River Branch Railroad was temporarily placed under the control of the United States Railroad Administration with the rest of the nation's railroads in 1917. It returned to independence on March 1, 1920, though the Hope Valley Advertiser noted that the company was too reliant on the New Haven to truly be considered an independent operation.

A fire destroyed the Wood River Branch Railroad engine house in the early hours of April 16, 1920, along with the company's sole remaining steam locomotive. The New Haven dispatched a replacement, which was rushed to Hope Valley and arrived quickly enough to run the first scheduled train on that day.

For several months in 1924, the Wood River Branch experienced "one of its biggest freight booms in its history" when state highway construction near Hope Valley demanded large shipments of trap rock and cement along the railroad. In a span of eight days, 110 cars of construction materials were handled, exceeding normal traffic levels by a significant margin. Also in 1924, the Wood River Branch defaulted on a more than $50,000 debt payment it owed the New Haven, which the larger company turned a blind eye to. Busy with its own money problems, the New Haven let the Wood River Branch continue operating rather than foreclose and assume its junior partner's financial issues as well.

End of passenger operations 

A major flood in November 1927 brought widespread damage to Rhode Island and shut down the Wood River Branch Railroad entirely, with multiple washouts from Woodville to Hope Valley and slight damage to the Wood River bridge. The railroad's passengers and mail were temporarily ferried by an automobile. Once the waters had receded, the New Haven dispatched an inspector, who estimated repairs would cost $5,000 to complete. The railroad had mounting financial problems: it had already defaulted on bond payments and was late in paying rental fees to the New Haven for equipment, when it could afford to pay them at all. While the $5,000 repair bill would not be significant for a healthy railroad, for the Wood River Branch it was an impossible demand.

Abandonment of the line appeared to be the only option, Watrous noting the company had consistently lost approximately $10,000 each year in the past decade. Having the New Haven take over would mean either spending a further $10,000 to relay the line with heavier rail and replacing old bridges, or operating the existing equipment with New Haven employees, which would require a significant increase in wages. It was suggested that the line acquire a gasoline powered locomotive which could be operated cheaply and without track upgrades, but obtaining one would cost $10,000. The board of directors met on November 15 at Watrous' request, and it was decided to seek permission from the Interstate Commerce Commission (ICC) to abandon the line. The washouts had stranded the railroad's passenger car, a leased New Haven locomotive, and a boxcar and hopper car in Hope Valley; a New Haven track crew joined forces with the Wood River Branch's employees to jack up the tracks at washouts so the stranded equipment could return to Wood River Junction. The Wood River Branch began shutting down, and its employees were laid off apart from a single man who continued fulfilling the line's mail contracts.

Residents and businesses in the area were largely opposed to the abandonment. On November 17, they held a meeting and several businessmen reported they were heavily dependent on the railroad. A local mill reported that coal deliveries by truck would be far more expensive, E. R. Bitgood's lumbering operation needed the railroad to export lumber, and grain mill owner (and speaker of the Rhode Island House of Representative) Roy Rawlings could not continue operating his mill without three to four railroad cars of grain a day. Concerned citizens made their opposition known to the ICC and the Rhode Island Public Utilities Commission, and also asked Richmond and Hopkinton to cancel the railroad's taxes if it could be reopened.

When the level of opposition came to its attention, the New Haven offered to keep the line running, conditional on eliminating passenger service and cutting the frequency of freight service, and sufficient cost-cutting to make operations profitable. In February 1928, the New Haven came to an agreement with local citizens to reopen the line for freight service only; a gasoline powered locomotive would be purchased and provided by the New Haven for this purpose. New Haven track gangs were dispatched to repair the line, and the company agreed to directly handle maintenance for a year. This time, the New Haven was officially the operator, but much as before it left day-to-day operations to Watrous. Technically, the New Haven could foreclose on the Wood River Branch at any time. However, it was to the New Haven's advantage not to do so; foreclosing meant New Haven employees would have to run the line, an expensive proposition due to the company's unionized workforce. The ICC could even force the New Haven to operate the line no matter how unprofitable it became, at a time when the New Haven was already having issues with profitability. Instead, the company offered to lease the line to the towns of Richmond and Hopkinton, but locals deemed this impractical. A new company to operate the line was suggested, but with the existing Wood River Branch Railroad still around, that company was revived and in April resumed train service.

Extensive steps were taken to cut costs. Only a few employees were retained, and the Plymouth locomotive (numbered A100) made a single round trip three or four days a week, a sharp reduction from the previous six runs per day. In 1934, the Wood River Branch became a one-man operation, with Hope Valley resident Otis A. Larkin responsible for operating the train, handling cargo, and maintaining the line and stations.

On April 15, 1937, the New Haven Railroad's bankruptcy trustees voted at the Wood River Branch's annual stockholders' meeting to abandon the line (the only stockholders being the New Haven and Watrous). Aged 73, and with his mother no longer alive, Watrous was largely consigned to the impending abandonment of the railroad. However, he also pledged his support should local citizens launch an effort to save the line.

The line was saved when Hope Valley resident (and past Speaker of the Rhode Island House of Representatives) Roy Rawlings personally purchased it on June 18, 1937, for $301. Happy to be free of dealing with the unprofitable line for good, the New Haven's trustees agreed to the sale, though the New Haven continued to lease the 20-ton gas locomotive to the Wood River Branch.

The company's new president unveiled the "President's Special", a unique train made up of a handcar powered by a small gasoline engine and a custom-built trailer with wheels taken from a handcar and several rows of seats attached. On its inaugural run, it traveled the entire length of the line in 18 minutes. While Rawlings' own grain mill generated the majority of traffic, the railroad also transported less-than-carload (not enough to fill an entire railroad car) traffic for locals, particularly farmers. In October 1938, the company reported handling approximately 10,000 tons of freight per year.

Demise and legacy 
The company finally came to an end in August 1947, when it received permission from the Interstate Commerce Commission to abandon its entire railroad and liquidate itself, following the destruction by fire of Rawlings' grain mill, which singlehandedly accounted for 85 percent of the Wood River Branch Railroad's traffic. The Bitgood Box factory, one of the other rail-served customers on the line, was also destroyed by a fire shortly after the grain mill. The Howard C. Woodmansee Coal and Oil Company was left as the only user of the line; with the overwhelming majority of its traffic lost, the Wood River Branch had no choice but to close. The line was dismantled for scrap and for the reuse of its rails on other railroads, with Rawlings telling a Connecticut newspaper that "Practically every junk dealer in the country wants to buy it".
Little of the Wood River Branch Railroad remains. Portions of its right-of-way remain extant as of 2017, and a pier from a Wood River Branch Railroad bridge remains in the Wood River. A handful of preserved mill buildings that were once railroad customers survive.

Passenger service 
The Wood River Branch ran passenger trains Monday through Saturday for much of its history, with no trains on Sundays. This changed July 29, 1903, when the company first offered passenger train service on Sundays. Four trips were then provided on Sundays, with two round trips in the middle of the morning and two more in the late afternoon. A typical schedule in 1903 had four round trips each day, each timed to connect with New Haven Railroad trains to Providence. Despite being considered a success, the last Sunday trains ran on September 11, 1904.

The small line was at the mercy of the New Haven's scheduling, and had to adjust its timetables when the New Haven changed its train service to Wood River Junction. Passenger service was terminated in 1927 following a major flood.

Accidents and incidents 
A man was accused of attempting to derail a Wood River Branch train on April 14, 1897. It was alleged William H. Baton had placed a railroad tie over the tracks, which was later struck by a train; the train was not derailed as the tie was caught in the locomotive's cowcatcher. A jury found Baton not guilty of placing a tie on the tracks.

A fatal accident, the first in the company's history, occurred on May 25, 1914. A local resident was traveling across the bridge over the Wood River on foot, despite being warned a train was due. A southbound train from Hope Valley rounded a curve near the bridge, and could not stop in time to avoid a collision. The man, Ernest Peter Palmer, was struck and thrown into the river. Though the train's crew dove into the river after him and recovered his body, a coroner later determined he was killed instantly upon impact with the train.

Locomotives 
The Wood River Branch Railroad's first locomotive was the Gardner Nichols, named after a local citizen of importance. It was a 4-4-0 locomotive built new by the Rhode Island Locomotive Works for the line. It ran on the Wood River Branch until 1906, when it was sold to a lumber company in the Southern United States.

Locomotive number 2, named Wincheck, was the second locomotive purchased, joining the Gardner Nichols in 1883 after being bought from the Narragansett Pier Railroad. Originally built in 1872, by 1898 Wincheck was irreparable.

Locomotive number 5, unofficially named Polly by the Wood River Branch's employees, was purchased used from the Long Island Rail Road in April 1896. Acquired to replace Wincheck, Polly developed a reputation for frequently breaking down and having accidents. This locomotive was sold for scrap in November 1906.

Cinderella, a second locomotive of a similar design to Polly was acquired used from the New Haven in 1904, and noted for being equipped with air brakes.

Station listing

See also 

 Moshassuck Valley Railroad
 Narragansett Pier Railroad
 Warwick Railway

Explanatory notes

Notes

References

External links 
Historic Photos: The Wood River Branch Railroad
Defunct Rhode Island railroads
Railway companies established in 1872
Railway companies disestablished in 1947
Companies affiliated with the New York, New Haven and Hartford Railroad
Railway lines opened in 1874
Railway lines closed in 1947